The Huawei Watch is an Android Wearbased smartwatch developed by Huawei. It was announced at the 2015 Mobile World Congress on September 2, 2015, and was released at Internationale Funkausstellung Berlin on September 2, 2015. It is the first smartwatch produced by Huawei.

Hardware
The Huawei Watch's form factor is based on the circular design of traditional watches, supporting a 42 mm (1.4 inch) AMOLED screen. The screen's resolution is 400 x 400 pixels and 285.7 ppi. The case is 316L stainless steel, covered with sapphire crystal glass in front and available in six finishes: Black Leather, Steel Link Bracelet, Stainless Steel Mesh, Black-plated Link Bracelet, Alligator-pressed Brown Leather, and Rose Gold-plated Link Bracelet.

The watch uses a 1.2 GHz Qualcomm Snapdragon 400 APQ8026 processor. All versions of the Huawei Watch have 512MB of RAM and 4GB of internal storage, along with a gyroscope, accelerometer, vibration motor, and heart rate sensor. It supports WiFi and Bluetooth 4.1 LE, and support for GPS locating. The watch uses a magnetic charging cradle, with a day and a half battery life.

Software
The watch runs on the Android Wear operating system. It works with iOS (8.2 and later) and Android (4.3 and later) devices. It currently supports Google Now voice commands and is compatible with Wear OS. The watch can process calls and receive messages and emails.

Reception
In Tech Advisors review, Chris Martin wrote, "this is a great looking smartwatch, although it is quite large. Specs match other Android Wear smartwatches but we're worried about the small battery." The President of Huawei U.S., Xu Zhejiang, said, "It embodies Huawei's technology innovation heritage, pursuit of premium design, and integration of useful functionality that we strive to develop in each product." The Phandroid said, "it is the classiest Android Wear smartwatch available right now".

Huawei Watch GT 2e

In March of 2020, Huawei announced the Huawei Watch GT 2e. It launched in India in May of 2020.  The smartwatch features the same 1.39-inch AMOLED touch display with a 454 x 454p resolution. It is powered by Huawei’s in-house Kirin A1 chipset along with GPS and Bluetooth audio that has 4GB of onboard storage. The onboard software can track over 100 different sports and exercises. The watch also features oxygen saturation monitoring with an SpO2 sensor that can calculate the wearer's maximum rate of oxygen consumption.

Huawei Watch 3 
In June of 2021, Huawei announced a new smartwatch—the Huawei Watch 3.

Huawei Watch GT 3 SE 
Huawei launched the Huawei Watch GT 3 SE on 29 October 2022, which is basically a more affordable version of the Watch GT3 Pro. It will initially be available in the markets of Vietnam and Poland. Although it will debut in the global market after a few days.

Only two colors are available, Black and Green, and the same will be available for sale first in Poland for the price equivalent to about €170.

Network 
Technology: HSPA / LTE

LAUNCH 
Announced: 2021, June 02

Status: Available. Released 2021, June 11

BODY 
Dimensions: 46.2 x 46.2 x 12.2 mm (1.82 x 1.82 x 0.48 in)

Weight: 54 g (1.90 oz)

Build: Glass front, ceramic back, stainless steel frame

SIM: ESIM

DISPLAY 
Type: AMOLED

Size: 1.43 inches

Resolution: 466 x 466 pixels (~326 ppi density)

PLATFORM 
OS: Harmony OS 2.0

MEMORY 
Card slot: NO

Internal: 16GB 2GB RAM

SOUND 
Loudspeaker: YES

3.5mm jack: NO

COMMS 
WLAN: Wi-Fi 802.11 b/g/n

Bluetooth: 5.2, A2DP, LE

GPS: Yes, with A-GPS, GLONASS, BDS, GALILEO, QZSS

NFC: Yes

Radio: NO

USB: NO

FEATURES 
Sensors: Accelerometer, gyro, heart rate, barometer, compass, SpO2, thermometer (body temperature)

BATTERY 
Type: Li-Ion, non-removable

Charging: Wireless charging 10W

See also
 Wearable computer
 Microsoft Band
 Apple Watch
 Pebble

References

External links

Huawei Watch 3 Official website

Android (operating system) devices
Products introduced in 2015
Wear OS devices
Smartwatches
Huawei products